Khan is a 2017 Pakistani serial drama directed by Ali Faizan, produced by Babar Javed, and written by Syed Atif Ali. It stars Noman Ijaz, Atiqa Odho, and Shaista Lodhi in lead roles and aired every Sunday at 8:00 pm. Later, it moved to Friday at 9:00 pm. It was the second drama to star Shaista Lodhi after her first series Waada.

Plot 
Khan holds great influence in making and demolishing the government. He happens to be a social worker, a caring husband, a doting father, and a caretaker of his sister. Not only this, he still remembers his ex-lover in a sincere manner, but very few people are aware of Khan’s dark personality.

Khan was born and brought up in a village where his parents served for a feudal family. Back in the days, he developed feelings for Sarwat, a girl in his neighborhood who had similar feelings for him. Their love seemed like an unbreakable bond, but fate has something else in store.

In an unfortunate circumstance, the son of the feudal lord kidnapped Sarwat, looted her of her honor, and killed a person who tried to stop him. In a bid to protect his own son, the feudal lord pressurizes Khan to claim responsibility of the murder and promises for his bail. Khan appears in the police station and accepts the crime of murder, without knowing that he is also accepting rape of his love interest. 

When Sarwat visits Khan in the police station, she asks him of the real culprit he is saving and spits on his face. This act jolts Khan’s ego and a volcano of revenge erupts in his mind. The emerging circumstances take Khan far away from his lover and he then finds about his real enemies. A resourceful person in jail frees Khan from police custody and takes oath from Khan to work for the underworld. 

Khan releases from prison with a single mission— gather unparalleled power, top-secrets of government officials and cut the throats of his opponents. He emerges as a billionaire; a plutocrat and an underworld don, who is a social activist for the world but a game changer from behind. When he finds that his former lover is married to his rival, sweet memories from their past start hurting Khan even more.

Cast
Noman Ijaz as Khan
Aijaz Aslam as Jamil
Shaista Lodhi
Atiqa Odho
Nauman Masood as Yaqoob
Saba Hameed
Yasir Shah as Haroon
Asad Malik
Yamina Peerzada
Ali Josh
Munawwar Saeed
Fatima Shah
Ali Hashmi
Usman Mazhar
Iman Zaidi

Production
The drama was produced by Babar Javed and was one of the most expensive dramas of Pakistan's television history.

References

2017 Pakistani television series debuts
Geo TV original programming
Pakistani telenovelas
Urdu-language telenovelas
Zee Zindagi original programming